Slup (until 1949 Čule) is a municipality and village in Znojmo District in the South Moravian Region of the Czech Republic. It has about 500 inhabitants.

Administrative parts
The village of Oleksovičky is an administrative part of Slup.

References

Villages in Znojmo District